Gergely Bogányi (born 4 January 1974) is a Hungarian pianist. Coming from a musical family, Bogányi is one of the youngest pianists to have won the Kossuth Prize, becoming one of the leading pianists of his generation.

Education 

Bogányi was born in 1974 in Vác, Hungary (his brother is conductor Tibor Bogányi), and started playing the piano at the age of four. He continued his studies at the Liszt Academy in Budapest, the Sibelius Academy in Helsinki and at Indiana University in Bloomington with professors László Baranyay, György Sebök, Matti Raekallio.

Piano Design
Bogányi, alongside his virtuoso piano playing, is known for his revolutionary piano designs including the Prestige B-262 and the larger Grand Prestige B-292, both of which are primarily constructed of carbon composites. “There have been no major developments in piano construction in over 100 years,” says Bogányi.  The estimated cost of the project was just under €1 million (£750,000).

Awards 

Gergely Bogányi has had success in several national and international competitions.
 In 1996 he won the International Franz Liszt Competition in Budapest. The name of other competition winners may be seen on the official "Filharmonia Budapest" webpage.
 Gergely Bogányi was appointed a citizen of honour in his native town Vác at the age of 22.
 In 2000 he was awarded the Liszt Prize by the Ministry of Cultural Heritage.
 In 2000 the Cross Merit of the White Rose of Finland by the President of the Finnish Republic.
 In 2001 his series of "Chopin's complete piano works" received the Hungarian Gramofon Prize in the category of "Best concert event and performing artist in Hungary".
 On March 15, 2004 he received the highest artistic award of Hungary, the Kossuth Prize.

Bogányi has performed worldwide, and performs as a soloist with leading orchestras, for example the London Philharmonic in 2004.

On November 27–28, 2010 he performed all the compositions of Frédéric Chopin at Palace of Arts (Művészetek Palotája in Hungarian) in Budapest.

Repertoire 
Pieces for piano solo
Mozart: Sonatas
Beethoven: 10 Sonatas
Schubert
 Sonatas
 Impromptus
Schumann
 Sonatas: F sharp minor, G minor
 Fantasie C major
 Papillons op.2.
 Karneval op.9.
 Kreisleriana op.16.
Chopin: Complete
Liszt
 Sonata B minor
 12 Etudes d'execution transcendente
 Zwei Konzertetüden
 Annees de pelerinage
 6 Consolations
 Rapsodies hongroises
 Rapsodie espagnole
Brahms
 Variation and Fuge on a Theme by Handel op.24.
 Zwei Rapsodies op.79
Bartók
 Study for Left Hand
 3 Burlesque op.8.c
 Allegro barbaro
 Sonatine
 Suite op 14.
 Etudes op18.
 Improvisations op.20
 Piano Sonata
 Out of Doors

Concertos
Haydn:G major
Mozart
 C major K. 467.
 C major K. 246
 C minor K. 491.
 D major K. 451
 D major K. 537. "Krönungskonzert"
 D minor K. 466
 G major K. 453
 A major K. 414
 A major K. 488
 B flat major K. 595
 Konzert-Rondo
 D major K. 382.
 A major K. 386
Beethoven Nr.4. G major
Mendelssohn: G minor
Schumann: A minor
Chopin:
 Nr.2. F minor
 Andante spianato & Grande Polonaise brillante
Liszt:
 Malediction
 Nr.1. E flat major
 Nr.2. A major
 Dance of Death (Totentanz)
 Hungarian Phantasy
Brahms:
 Nr.1. D minor
 Nr.2. B flat major
Tchaikovsky: B flat minor
Grieg: A minor
Rachmaninov:
 Nr.2. C minor
 Nr.3. D minor
Furtwängler:
 Symphonic concerto for piano and orchestra B minor
Petrovics: Piano Concerto

Sources

External links 
 Gergely Bogányi’s official website.
 Bogányi Piano official website.
 Gergely Bogányi plays Fauré’s Sonata.
 Herend Herald.
 Kelemen Barnabas official website.
  Hoertnagel.
 Wien International.
 BMC
 Tiszadob Piano Festival.

1974 births
Living people
Franz Liszt Academy of Music alumni
Hungarian classical pianists
Hungarian male musicians
Male classical pianists